Theodore Wilbur Houk(1907-1978) was a physician in Seattle, Washington during the mid 1900s. He was one of the first to use penicillin in the Pacific NW and was director of medical education at Providence Hospital in Seattle.

Houk was born in Centralia, Washington in 1907.

Ted Houk provided leadership roles in the Model Yacht Racing Association of America and his marine designs were the fastest in their class for the next 20 years.

These designs are stored at the Mystic Seaport Museum in Mystic Seaport, Connecticut. He was at various times President of the Model Yacht Racing Association of America, the Washington Kayak Club, the NW Division of the American Canoe Association, and the Seattle Canoe and Kayak Club which still sponsors an annual Ted Houk Memorial Regatta.  He was an avid and skilled participant in all of these sports and camped from his kayak on uninhabited islands for a week at a time with only a jack knife.  In his late 60s he accomplished a lifetime goal of setting foot from his kayak on all the American San Juan Islands and Canadian Gulf Islands.

He died in Seattle, Washington in 1978.

External links
Mystic Seaport Museum of America and the Sea
 Seattle Canoe and Kayak Club

Physicians from Seattle
1907 births
1978 deaths